Davenport Mid City High School is a public alternative high school located in north central Davenport, Iowa. Mid City High School was established in 2014 in the building that was formerly a medical facility.  It replaced the previous alternative school in the district, which was called the Kimberly Center.

The purpose of the alternative high school is to decrease the school district's dropout rate.  Many of the students enrolled here had problems in their previous schools.  Classroom configurations include both traditional settings and collaborative learning settings that are more appropriate for team and project-based learning.  The schools mascot, Mavericks, was chosen to reflect a student body that is "unorthodox, independent-minded and individualist, nonconformist, free speech, original or eccentric."

The school is housed in a building that originally housed a medical-office complex at the former Davenport Osteopathic Hospital.

See also
List of high schools in Iowa

References

Public high schools in Iowa
Educational institutions established in 2014
Schools in Davenport, Iowa
Alternative schools in the United States
2014 establishments in Iowa